Mahir Ünlü (born 1926) was a Turkish author. He was born in Harput.

Ünlü was a Turkish language and literature teacher at various military schools in Turkey from 1951 to 1971. After retiring, he continued teaching literature at Darüşşafaka Lycee and Saint Joseph Lycee in Istanbul from 1971 to 1980.

Writings and books
 Cönk Gibi / Türkçede İnciler İncelikler
 Çağdaş Türk Edebiyatına Doğru – 19. Yüzyıl
 Dede Korkut Öyküleri
 Kavramlar ve Boyutları
 Lise Hazırlık Sınıfı Türkçe Dilbigisi
 Şinasi
 Türkçede Öykü-Roman
 Türkçede Yazınsal Eleştiri
 Yatılı Dolmakalem
 Yirminci yüzyıl Türk edebiyatı
 Toplumsallık Açısından Örneklerle Türk Edebiyatı (İslamlık Sürecinde) 1982

External links
http://www.sj.k12.tr/index.php?option=com_content&view=article&id=1607%3Amahir-uenlue&catid=282&lang=tr
https://web.archive.org/web/20060221134027/
http://kitap.antoloji.com/kisi.asp?CAS=128106

1926 births
Possibly living people
People from Elazığ